John Hamilton Bowie  (born 16 July 1938) is an Australian scientist and academic, best known for his contributions to research in the fields of the chemistry of negative ions in the gas phase and of bio-active peptides in skin glands.

Bowie was born educated in Melbourne, and graduated from the University of Melbourne where he obtained an MSc for his work on the colouring matters of Australian plants, obtained his PhD at the University of Nottingham.  He subsequently took up an ICI fellowship at the University of Cambridge under Lord Todd. In 1966 he was appointed to a lectureship at the University of Adelaide, rising to become head of department.  In 1968 he was awarded the Rennie Memorial Medal for his work on the rearrangement of positively charged organic molecules.  In 1974 he was awarded the H. G. Smith Memorial Medal of the Royal Australian Chemical Institute.  From 1989 to 1992 he was Pro-Vice-Chancellor of the university.

In 2017 Bowie was appointed a Member of the Order of Australia for significant service to science in the field of mass spectrometry, and to education as an academic, researcher and author.

References

1938 births
Academic staff of the University of Adelaide
Australian chemists
Living people
Members of the Order of Australia